G. Karunakara Reddy (born 10 April 1962) is an Indian politician from the state of Karnataka, who is the member of the Karnataka Legislative Assembly from Harapanahalli assembly constituency. He was made Revenue Minister in B.S Yeddyurappa Cabinet. He was previously a member of the 14th Lok Sabha from the Bellary constituency as a member of the Bharatiya Janata Party.

Karnataka Politics
In the 2008 assembly elections, he contested against Congress leader and former deputy chief minister of Karnataka M.P. Prakash from Harpanahalli constituency in Davanagere District and won by a margin of over 25218 votes. He and his younger brother G. Janardhana Reddy, a MLC from Bellary, were subsequently made ministers in the BJP government led by B. S. Yeddyurappa, when the latter needed the support of a section of MLAs loyal to the Reddy brothers.

After D. V. Sadananda Gowda of the BJP took over as CM from Yeddyurappa following the Lokayukta report on illegal mining in 2011, subsequently, Yeddyurappa broke away from the BJP to form the Karnataka Janata Paksha (KJP) and later rejoined BJP in 2014.

External links
 Members of Fourteenth Lok Sabha - Parliament of India website

References

Living people
1962 births
India MPs 2004–2009
People from Bellary
Lok Sabha members from Karnataka
Bharatiya Janata Party politicians from Karnataka
Karnataka Janata Paksha politicians
Karnataka MLAs 2008–2013
Karnataka MLAs 2018–2023